Buena High School can refer to:
Buena High School (Arizona), in Sierra Vista, Arizona
Buena High School (California), in Ventura, California
Buena Regional High School, in Buena, New Jersey